X-T. Rex (previously Bill Legend's T. Rex) are a band formed in 2014 by former T. Rex member Bill Legend. They have completed a European tour and were expected to release an album.

History
In 2014 Bill Legend, the last surviving member of the classic 1970–1973 T. Rex lineup, went about putting a new band together to perform old T. Rex songs despite having signed a petition to attempt to stop Mickey Finn's T-Rex. from performing with the T. Rex name a few years earlier. He recruited lead vocalist Danny McCoy, lead guitarist Ross McEwen, keyboardist Lee Swindon and bassist Stuart McArthur to complete the lineup. They have completed a tour of Europe and are expected to release an album titled Mover and the Groover despite T. Rex fans being unhappy about a new album under a slightly different name to the original band.

Band members
Bill Legend - drums (2014–present)
Danny McCoy - lead vocals (2014–present)
Ross McEwen - lead guitar (2014–present)
Lee Swindon - keyboards (2014–present)
Stuart McArthur - bass guitar (2014–present)

Discography
 Mover and the Groover (Unreleased)

References

External links
 Bill Legend's T. Rex official web site

English glam rock groups
Musical groups established in 2014
2014 establishments in England